Mala Lahinja is a settlement at the source of the Lahinja River south of Dragatuš in the Municipality of Črnomelj in the White Carniola area of southeastern Slovenia. The area is part of the traditional region of Lower Carniola and is now included in the Southeast Slovenia Statistical Region.

Geography
The Zjot Karst Field lies south of Mala Lahinja, near the source of the Lahinja River.

References

External links
Mala Lahinja on Geopedia

Populated places in the Municipality of Črnomelj